Arnold of St. Martin's, Irish abbot, died 1103.

Hogan states that Arnold was the last Irish abbot of Great St. Martin Church, quoting a chronicle of Cologne, which states:

Ultimus ille fuit praesul de gente Scotorum.

See also

 Tilmo, founder of St. Martin's, fl. 690.
 Minnborinus of Cologne, refounder of St. Martin's, died 986.
 Helias of Cologne, abbot of St. Martin's and St. Panthelon's, died 1040.
 Schottenklöster

References

 Irish Monasteries in Germany, J.F. Hogan, pp. 526–535, Irish Ecclesiastical Record, 4th series, Vol. 3, 1898.
 Deutschland und Irland: 1000 Jahre Gemeinsamer Geschichte, Martin Elsasser, Brookside Press, Dublin, 1997. .

External links
 https://archive.org/stream/s4irishecclesias03dubluoft#page/526/mode/2up
 

11th-century Irish abbots
12th-century Irish abbots
Irish expatriates in Germany
1103 deaths
Year of birth unknown